Brad Cox (1944–2021) was an American computer scientist.

Brad Cox may also refer to:
 Brad Cox (musician), Australian country singer-songwriter
Brad Cox (physicist), American physicist
Brad H. Cox (born 1980), American racehorse trainer

See also
Bradford Cox, American singer-songwriter and musician